Leonel Guillermo Sánchez Lineros (25 April 1936 – 2 April 2022) was a Chilean professional footballer who played as a striker on the left wing.

He is recognized as one of the Best South American Footballers of the 20th Century and one of the great forwards in the history of the FIFA World Cup. He was goalscorer of the 1962 FIFA World Cup where Chile achieved a historic third place in the largest global event for national teams, was part of the ideal eleven of the World Cup and was awarded the Golden Boot and the Bronze Ball from FIFA. He was also included in the top 100 players of the history of the World Cups by FIFA. At the continental level he was part of the ideal eleven of the América Cup 1956, where together with the Chile national team he won a runner-up. In addition Conmebol included him among the best specialists of free kicks in the history of South America.

Considered one of the best Chilean players in history —especially in the position of forward, which he held throughout his career— and one of the club's greatest idols namely  Universidad de Chile, where he was one of the leaders of the Blue Ballet era (1959–1969), is remembered for having been the leader of the Chil national team that placed third in the 1962 FIFA World Cup, a tournament in which he was also one of the top scorers and one of the prominent participants in the infamous match against Italy. In La Roja, Leonel Sánchez is the seventh all-time top scorer with a total of 24 goals and 13 assists.

His performances both at the Universidad of Chile and in the national team made him position himself and be chosen by the IFFHS as the 40th Best South American Footballer of the 20th Century, surpassing several international references such as his compatriot Iván Zamorano, the Brazilians Domingos da Guia and Ademir Marques de Menezes, the Uruguayan José Pedro Cea and the Argentine Raimundo Orsi.

Career
Leonel Sanchez was the son of a professional boxer.

Sanchez studied at República Argentina, a prestigious public primary school of Santiago; and at Manuel Barros Borgoño, a traditional public secondary school of the capital.

He played at left midfield for over 20 years between 1953 and 1973. 17 of those 20 years were for Universidad de Chile, where he was the icon of the Ballet Azul (Blue Ballet), a team that won 6 national championships between 1959 and 1969.

Four of his 24 international goals were at the 1962 World Cup on home soil, where he was the top scorer along with five other players as Chile finished the tournament in third place. In that World Cup he is also remembered for his disputes with several Italian players in the infamous Chile – Italy match in the first round: he knocked out the Italian player Mario David with a punch in an altercation after being fouled, and was subsequently kicked in the head by David a few minutes later, resulting in the Italian defender's sending off. Sánchez later also broke Humberto Maschio's nose with a left hook; Chile won the match 2–0. Because of his role in the match, later dubbed the "Battle of Santiago", in 2007, The Times placed Sánchez at number 6 in their list of the 50 hardest footballers in history.

Sánchez remained at Universidad de Chile, although he received numerous offers from well known European clubs such as Real Madrid, Juventus and A.C. Milan. In 1969, after a contract rule was settled, Universidad de Chile was forced to sell him. He finished his career playing for different Chilean clubs such as Colo-Colo, Palestino and Ferroviarios.

Career statistics

Club

International

Scores and results list Chile's goal tally first, score column indicates score after each Sánchez goal.

Honours
Universidad de Chile
Chilean League: 1959, 1962, 1964, 1965, 1967, 1969
Metropolitan Tournament of Chile: 1968, 1969
Copa Francisco Candelori: 1969

Colo-Colo
Chilean League: 1970

Individual
Golden Boot: 1962
All-Star Team: 1962 FIFA World Cup
IFFHS South America best Player of the Century: N°40

References

1936 births
2022 deaths
Chilean footballers
Footballers from Santiago
Association football forwards
Chile international footballers
1962 FIFA World Cup players
1966 FIFA World Cup players
Chilean Primera División players
Universidad de Chile footballers
Colo-Colo footballers
Club Deportivo Palestino footballers
Ferroviarios footballers
Chilean football managers
Universidad de Chile managers